Governor Faron may refer to:

Joseph Faron (1819–1881), Interim Governor of Cochinchina from 1869 to 1870
Pierre Aristide Faron, Governor General of Inde française from 1871 to 1875